Christoph Franz von Hutten (1673–1729) was the Prince-Bishop of Würzburg from 1724 to 1729.

Christoph Franz von Hutten was born in Mainberg in Lower Franconia on 19 May 1673. He was the son of Ritter Johann von Hutten (1629–90) and his wife Anna Maria, née Freiin von Hagen zu Motten und Buschfeld (1649–98).

He was educated at the University of Würzburg from 1680 to 1685. In 1686, he became a canon (Domizellar) of Würzburg Cathedral and of Comburg. He then studied at the Collegium Germanicum in Rome. He spent 1690–91 at the University of Siena. He then studied at the University of Mainz.

He was made a canon of Bamberg Cathedral on 2 March 1711. He became dean of Würzburg Cathedral on 12 November 1716. On 31 October 1717 he was ordained as a priest.

The cathedral chapter of Würzburg Cathedral elected him Prince-Bishop of Würzburg on 2 October 1724; Pope Benedict XIII confirmed his appointment on 28 December 1724. Johann Bernhard Mayer, auxiliary bishop of Würzburg, consecrated him as a bishop on 8 April 1725.

He died of pneumonia on 25 March 1729. He was buried in Würzburg Cathedral on 26 April 1729.

References

External links

1673 births
1729 deaths
Prince-Bishops of Würzburg
Deaths from pneumonia in Germany